White Eye is a 2019 Israeli live-action short film by Tomer Shushan. It was nominated for Best Live Action Short Film at the 93rd Academy Awards.

Summary
A man finds his stolen bicycle and it now belongs to a stranger.
In his attempts to retrieve the bicycle, he struggles to remain human.

Accolades
Academy Award for Best Live Action Short Film nomination
SXSW Film Festival – Narrative Short Jury Award
Palm Springs ShortFest

See also
Cinema of Israel
List of Israeli submissions for the Academy Award for Best International Feature Film

External links

References

2019 films
Israeli short films
Films about racism
One-shot films